Abraham Isaac Quintanilla Jr. (born February 20, 1939) is an American singer, songwriter, and producer. He is the father of Tejano singer Selena and was her manager throughout her life.

Quintanilla was born to a Mexican-American family in Corpus Christi, Texas. He began his music career as a member of the singing group the "Dinos" in 1956. He left the group in the late 1960s and initially retired from music to raise a family. After discovering Selena's singing talent, he created the band Selena y Los Dinos composed of Selena and her two older siblings to develop her talent. Under his management, the group became a major success in Tejano music by the late 1980s, allowing Selena to begin a solo career and become one of the most celebrated Latin music artists of all time. Following Selena's murder in 1995, Quintanilla became an executive producer of a biographical film about her life, in which he was portrayed by actor Edward James Olmos.

Early life 
Quintanilla was born on February 20, 1939, in Corpus Christi, Texas, the middle child of six siblings, to Abraham Gonzalez Quintanilla Sr. and Maria Tereza Calderon. Quintanilla's parents worked along the Rio Grande in Texas, gleaning vegetables, cotton and fruits. When he was fourteen, his parents left the Catholic Church and converted to Jehovah's Witnesses. Quintanilla's father later worked as an autobody repairman.

Quintanilla attended Roy Miller High School and soon joined with two of his friends to form a high school choir called the Gumdrops. Abraham dropped out of Roy Miller High School when he was a senior to pursue his career. Maria strongly disapproved of her son's desire to become a professional singer.

Career

Early years 
In 1956, Quintanilla encountered his alumni classmates performing at a high school dance. He immediately recognized their voices and was hooked. While learning that one of their lead vocalists was quitting the band: Abraham immediately approached the "Dinos" and asked if he could be part of their singing group. The group decided to give Abraham a chance by inviting him to practice with them. Quintanilla's request was granted when the Dinos crowned him as the "third voice". During the beginning stages of the group, the Dinos were paid thirty US dollars in booked venues. Los Dinos cited their musical inspirations as having originated from the musical ensembles  The Four Aces and Mills Brothers. In 1959, Los Dinos released their first single "So Hard to Tell" on the J.W. Fox label that was owned by Johnny Herrera. The single became a classic hit on KEYS and helped the band to obtain bookings at sock hops in Corpus, Kingsville and Woodsboro, Texas.

The Dinos' second single "Give Me One Chance", which was composed by Teddy Randazzo who had written songs for Little Anthony and the Imperials, sold 150,000 copies. The single began getting extensive airplay throughout south Texas and on KILT-FM. Los Dinos' popularity prospered after the record sales of "Give Me One Chance". The band recorded ten English-language revolutions per minutes and covered songs of The Beatles, Ray Stevens, Johnny Tillotson, Tommy Roe, Sam & Dave and the Five Americans.
{{Listen|filename=Con Esta Copa - Los Dinos.ogg|title="Con Esta Copa" (1964)|description=One of Los Dinos' most-known songs during their era in the 1960s.

The band's next singles "Twistin' Irene", "Ride Your Pony", and "Lover's Holiday" sold poorly. In October 1961, Quintanilla joined the United States Air Force.  After boot camp, he was stationed at McChord Air Force Base in Tacoma, Washington. While there, he met the half-Mexican American and half-Cherokee Indian Marcella Samora.  Samora's father originated from Amarillo, while her mother was from Colorado. Quintanilla and Samora married on June 8, 1963.

After Quintanilla's discharge from active duty in November 1963, his wife gave birth to their first child, Abraham "A.B." Quintanilla III on December 13 of the same year.  Within a month after their son's birth, the family moved out of Washington to Corpus Christi, Texas.  Following the return to his hometown, Quintanilla re-joined Los Dinos and began singing American pop and Rock and roll music. While performing to a crowd of concertgoers of Mexican descent, Los Dinos were chided to play Spanish-language Mexican music. When they continued playing their planned pop and rock music lineup, they were heckled and called "queers" by their fellow Mexican-Americans. The people at the club were refunded their money after the band confessed to not knowing any Mexican music. This angered people who wanted to dance and they chased the band out of the building. Local Corpus Christi police had to be called in to escort the band out. The band changed their musical genre to Chicano rock due to costs in creating English-language popular music and the popularity of the band. Los Dinos recorded their first record Con Esta Copa (With This Cup) in 1964 on Arnoldo Ramirez label Falcon Records. The single "Con esta copa" became an instant hit in Texas and had heavy airplay at the time of its release on Epitome. The single was also played in neighboring states.

The band released three more records with Falcon until they moved on to Bernal records. On June 29, 1967, Marcella gave birth to their second child and first daughter, Suzette Michelle Quintanilla. By 1969, Los Dinos' popularity had faded and their record sales began to decline. Quintanilla later quit the band while the rest of the group went on without him.

Los Dinos continued to record music and by 1974, the band had recorded twenty 45s and six LP records. The band members then officially ended their careers.

With Selena y Los Dinos 

Quintanilla moved to Lake Jackson, Texas in the early 1970s and began working full-time to support his wife and children. He worked for Dow Chemical, putting his passion for music aside. They were settling into life in Lake Jackson when Marcella was told by doctors that she had a tumor that needed to be removed immediately. Marcella and Quintanilla decided to get a second opinion before they agreed to surgery. The second doctor informed them that there was no tumor; Marcella was pregnant.  They were told this baby was a boy and began planning for a son.  They picked the name Marc Antony (Quintanilla), but Marcella instead delivered a daughter on April 16, 1971, at Freeport Community Hospital. A woman who shared Marcella's semi-private hospital room suggested the name "Selena".

Quintanilla was teaching his oldest child, A.B., to play a guitar when Selena entered and began singing along with her father. Quintanilla noticed Selena's fine voice, and, believing she was truly gifted, wasted no time working to develop her vocal talent. Quintanilla  formed a new group and based its name on his childhood band, Selena y Los Dinos (Selena And The Guys). Quintanilla, with the help of his former recording studio manager and friend, began recording songs with Selena and building a foundation for a music career for his children.

In 1979, Quintanilla opened up a Mexican restaurant called PapaGayo's (Parrots) and built a stage platform so his children could perform for the restaurant's patrons as they enjoyed their meal. The restaurant suffered from the recession of 1981 and was forced to close. This economy had severe impact on the Quintanillas and other South Texas families.  Abraham took his musical aspirations and relocated to Corpus Christi after his family was forced to sell their home to avoid bankruptcy. Selena y Los Dinos and their father performed at street corners, parties, weddings, and any other social function that provided income for the family.

In 1984, Selena y Los Dinos were signed to Freddie Records. They recorded and released their début album entitled Selena Y Los Dinos. Selena was criticized by Freddie Martinez (CEO of Freddie Records) for being a young female in a male-dominated genre. Quintanilla transferred his children to Cara Records and released their second album, The New Girl in Town. This album led to Selena y Los Dinos' appearance as musical guests on the Johnny Canales Show.

By 1989 Selena had released eight long plays on Manny Guerra's independent labels, GP Productions and Record Producer Productions. These albums launched Selena's domination of the Tejano Music Awards, beginning in 1986. Selena's performance at the TMAs caught the eye of Jose Behar, the former head of Sony Music Latin. Behar signed Selena with Capitol/EMI. He later said that he signed Selena because he thought he had discovered the next Gloria Estefan.

Selena won the 1993 Grammy Award for "Best Mexican-American Album" for Selena Live!.

Selena's 1994 album Amor Prohibido became the biggest-selling Latin album of all time. Amor Prohibido was certified 20× Platinum (Latin type) by the RIAA for selling over two million copies, and eventually sold over five million worldwide. Selena's sales and fan base increased and paved the way to achieve her dream of recording an English crossover album in prospective.

Death of Selena 

On March 31, 1995, Quintanilla's youngest child, Selena, was murdered by the president of the Selena Fan Club, manager of Selena's boutiques, Selena Etc. and friend, Yolanda Saldívar.

After Selena's death, Quintanilla has been involved in every development of albums, documentaries, and other productions that involves or talks about Selena. Soon after Selena's death, Abraham Quintanilla and his family started The Selena Foundation, a charitable organization which assists children in crisis. Abraham Quintanilla has appeared in numerous television specials about Selena. Quintanilla continues to produce new acts in the music and film industries with his record company, Q-Productions.

In the 1997 biopic-film, Selena, Quintanilla was portrayed by Edward James Olmos while Quintanilla himself served as co-producer. In the 2020 Netflix miniseries Selena: The Series, he was portrayed by Ricardo Chavira. In 2021, Quintanilla released his memoir A Father's Dream: My Family's Journey in Music .

Discography 
Studio albums

Filmography

References

Works cited

External links 

Q-Productions.com website

1939 births
Living people
A. B. Quintanilla
American folk singers
American Jehovah's Witnesses
American male singers
American male television actors
American music video directors
American musicians of Mexican descent
American ranchera singers
Record producers from Texas
Chicano rock musicians
Dow Chemical Company employees
Latin pop singers
Selena y Los Dinos members
Mariachi musicians
People from Corpus Christi, Texas
Polka musicians
Selena
Singers from Texas
Spanish-language singers of the United States
Converts to Jehovah's Witnesses
Former Roman Catholics
People from Lake Jackson, Texas
Hispanic and Latino American musicians